The 1979–80 League of Ireland was contested by 16 teams, and Limerick United won the championship.

Final classification

Results

Top scorers

Ireland, 1979-80
1979–80 in Republic of Ireland association football
League of Ireland seasons